The European Association of Nuclear Medicine (EANM) is an umbrella organisation comprising 41 national nuclear medicine member societies, 18 non-European affiliated societies and 3,200 individual members from over 80 countries, including physicians, scientists, technologists and other persons working in nuclear medicine or related fields. It is a professional non-profit association representing the nuclear medicine sector to the European institutions and informing the general public and healthcare authorities about ongoing developments within the field.

Activities

The EANM hosts its own annual congress, which attracts more than 6,300 delegates. The EANM Congress features plenary lectures, free paper sessions on the most relevant advances in the field, symposia and debates, a full CME programme and a self-contained technologists’ continuing education section.

The EANM publishes practical guidelines for a wide range of nuclear medicine procedures, both independently and in collaboration with other professional organisations such as its American counterpart, the Society of Nuclear Medicine and Molecular Imaging.

History

The EANM was founded in 1985 in London when the Society of Nuclear Medicine Europe merged with the European Nuclear Medicine Society. Both societies’ focuses are still reflected within the EANM since the association simultaneously acts as a forum for individual members (who convene annually at the Members’ Assembly) and as an umbrella for the nuclear medicine societies of Europe (which convene at the Delegates’ Assembly).

References

External links
Official website

Nuclear medicine organizations
International medical associations of Europe
Organizations established in 1985
1985 establishments in Austria